Merchant Wayne Huxford (1798–1877) was a physician, United States politician and former mayor of Fort Wayne, Indiana. He was born in Conway, Massachusetts and later moved to St. Marys, Ohio before finally settling permanently in Fort Wayne.

He was educated in pharmacy and was the first druggist in Fort Wayne. He practiced medicine and ran a drug store in the frontier town.

He was elected mayor of Fort Wayne in a special election to fill the vacancy left by John M. Wallace, who resigned as mayor after serving one year. He served as mayor of Fort Wayne for three terms after being reelected twice.

He is buried in Lindenwood Cemetery in Fort Wayne.

References 
The Pictorial History of Fort Wayne, Indiana, B. J Griswold (1927)

1798 births
1877 deaths
People from Conway, Massachusetts
Mayors of Fort Wayne, Indiana
Physicians from Indiana
Burials in Indiana
19th-century American politicians
People from St. Mary's, Ohio